Retroelement silencing factor 1 is a protein that in humans is encoded by the RESF1 gene. RESF1 is broadly expressed in the lymph nodes, ovaries, appendix and spleen.  RESF1 shows characteristics of being a minor histocompatibility antigen, as well as tumor suppressor capabilities. The high expression in the lymph nodes and spleen indicate function in the immune system.

Gene 
RESF1 is a protein coding gene found on Chromosome 12 and maps to 12p11.21. Alternative names for this gene include Gonad Expressed Transcript (GET), UTA2-1 and C12orf35. RESF1 has 7 exons, 3 of which occur before the start codon.

Tissue expression

Normal 
A study of normal human tissue expression profiling shows that RESF1 is highly expressed in the thymus, spleen, bone marrow and liver. This is interesting as it relates to common organs associated with the Immune system.

Gene tissue expression patterns found through the National Center for Biotechnology Information UniGene EST Profile showed that there was also high expression of RESF1 in the lymph nodes, uterus, mouth, thyroid, larynx and blood.

Cancer 
An evaluation of RESF1 expression in health states was performed using NCBI Unigene’s EST Profile. Although RESF1 is highly expressed in uterine tumors, it is also highly expressed in the uterus, suggesting that it is unlikely the gene is associated closely with uterine cancer. However, RESF1 may be related to adrenal tumors, as there was lower expression of this gene within normal kidney tissue.

Transcript

Transcription factor binding sites 
Transcription factor binding sites within the promoter of RESF1 included mainly transcription factors that were associated with bone marrow cells, antibody- producing cells, and blood cells. This supports the association of RESF1 with the functioning immune system.

Protein 

RESF1 is 1747 amino acids in length and has one domain of unknown function, DUF4617. The Molecular Weight of RESF1 is 194.9 kdal. The basal isoelectric point is 8.95. A localization prediction suggests that RESF1 is likely a nuclear protein.

Protein structure 

The secondary structure of RESF1 consists of mainly random coil structures (approximately 59.2%), few alpha helices (24% of residues) and fewer extended strands (15.8% of residues).

A predicted 3-D structure was created using Swiss model work space, shown above.

Protein interactions 

RESF1 interacts with NANOG, MDM2, EXOC1 and CALML3. These interactions further suggest RESF1 is a nuclear protein, and that it may be associated with tumor-suppressor proteins and immune system proteins.

EXOC1 was involved in a schizophrenia study, relating a schizophrenia risk gene (DISC1) to a network of protein-protein interactions. This study used a two-hybrid assay as evidence to the protein interaction between RESF1 and EXOC1. EXOC1 functions as a response to microbial infections, which reduces viral RNA synthesis and protein translation.

NANOG was predicted to interact with RESF1 based on an affinity capture-MS, which linked NANOG to proteins involved with the cell cycle. This study used affinity purification combined with high accuracy mass spectrometry to find specific protein interactions. NANOG was also found to be an essential transcription factor in embryonic stem cells, specifically involved in gene expression to affect cell fate.

MDM2 is a gene that interacts with others to affect the cell cycle and apoptosis, and is located in tissues common to RESF1, such as the uterus and lymph node. MDM2 was found to interact with RESF1 through the use of a phage display library. This interaction further suggests that RESF1 is a nuclear protein, as MDM2 and its splice variants contain nuclear localization signals for nucleoplasmic distribution.

CALML3 was found to interact with RESF1 based on affinity capture-MS assay, similar to how NANOG was found to interact with RESF1. A study on CALML3 expression in epidermal development showed that CALML3 was useful marker for development, and loss of CALML3 expression correlated with malignant phenotypes.

Evolutionary relationships

Orthologs 
The closest orthologs to RESF1 are primates, however, conserved sequences can be found in whales, bears, snakes, birds, turtles, and frogs. Orthologs of RESF1 diverged as long ago as 353 million years ago (Xenopus laevis), while the closest evolutionary ortholog is Papio anubis, which diverged approximately 28.1 million years ago.

Phylogenetic tree 
An unrooted phylogenetic tree of RESF1 was created of 20 orthologs and the human RESF1 gene.

Molecular phylogeny 
A graph shown below of the molecular evolution of RESF1 shows that it evolved relatively quickly compared to both cytochrome C, a slowly evolving protein, and fibrinogen alpha, which evolved more quickly than cytochrome C. The comparison shows that RESF1 is fairly quickly diverging, which suggests that it could be a gene that changes quickly in response to its environment, such as the introduction of a pathogen.

References 

Genes